Jim McGregor (December 30, 1921 – July 30, 2013) was the head men's basketball coach at Whitworth College (1950–53), and New Mexico State (1965–66). He also coached many international teams including Italy (1954–56), Greece, Turkey (1960, for the Olympics), Sweden, Austria, Peru, Morocco, Central Africa, Colombia, and a number of league European league teams. McGregor graduated from Grant High School in Portland, Oregon. He served in the Marines during World War 2. He was also pioneer in promoting American basketball to European teams by taking players that had not been drafted by the NBA and playing exhibition games against European teams. Many players from these teams were signed to contracts to play in Europe - far before this became a commonplace. McGregor received fees when these players signed contracts - and thus an early agent in international basketball. McGregor was inducted into the Grant High School Athletic Hall of Fame in 2011. McGregor died on July 30, 2013.

Head coaching record

References

External links
 Jim McGregor, international basketball ambassador was 91
 Coaching Record
 Washington Post - One Globetrotter's Placement Service

1931 births
2013 deaths
American men's basketball coaches
Basketball coaches from Oregon
Grant High School (Portland, Oregon) alumni
High school basketball coaches in the United States
New Mexico State Aggies men's basketball coaches
Sportspeople from Portland, Oregon
USC Trojans men's basketball coaches
USC Trojans men's track and field athletes
Whitworth Pirates men's basketball coaches
Track and field athletes from Portland, Oregon